Chitra is a genus of turtles in the family Trionychidae.

Species
Chitra chitra  – Asian narrow-headed softshell turtle
C. c. chitra  – Siamese narrow-headed softshell turtle
C. c. javanensis  – Javanese narrow-headed softshell turtle
Chitra indica  – Indian narrow-headed softshell turtle
Chitra vandijki  – Burmese narrow-headed softshell turtle

Nota bene: A binomial authority in parentheses indicates that the species was originally described in a genus other than Chitra.

References

Bibliography
Gray JE (1844). Catalogue of the Tortoises, Crocodiles, and Amphisbænians, in the Collection of the British Museum. London: Trustees of the British Museum. (Edward Newman, printer). viii + 80 pp. (Chitra, new genus, p. 49).

 
Turtle genera
Taxa named by John Edward Gray